The mass media in Israel refers to print, broadcast and online media available in the State of Israel. The country boasts dozens of newspapers, magazines, and radio stations, which play an important role by the press in political, social and cultural life and cater it to a modern, developed and literate society.

There are over ten different languages in the Israeli media, with Hebrew as the predominant one. Press in Arabic caters to the Arab citizens of Israel, with readers from areas including those governed by the Palestinian National Authority. During the eighties and nineties, the Israeli press underwent a process of significant change as the media gradually came to be controlled by a limited number of organizations, whereas the papers published by political parties began to disappear. Today, three large, privately owned conglomerates based in Tel Aviv dominate the mass media in Israel.

Censorship in Israel is exercised when it is certain that publication of the item in question would harm public safety. When an item is censored, the newspaper may appeal the censor's ruling to a "committee of three," composed of a member of the public (who serves as the chairman), a representative of the army and a representative of the press. The decisions of the committee are binding, and over the years it has in many cases overruled the decision of the censor.

History 

The history of the press began in 1863, before Israeli independence and during the Ottoman Empire, with Ha-Levanon and Havatzelet being the first weekly Hebrew newspapers established. In 1952, the International Publishing Company J-M Ltd was established as the state's first book publisher. Censorship was regularly enforced in years after independence, throughout the Yom Kippur War and the 1970s. In 1986, the government allowed for the establishment of private and commercial media outlets to run in competition with state media.

Freedom of the press 

The Israeli government generally respects freedom of the press, which is protected by the Basic Laws of Israel and independent judiciary. Hate speech, and publishing praise of violence or issues of national security is prohibited. While Israeli journalists operate with little restriction, the government has placed more restrictions on Palestinian journalists working in the region, as Reporters Without Borders alleges that the authorities entered Palestinian offices and homes looking for "illegal material". The media does carry criticism of government policy.

Publication of a newspaper in Israel is illegal without a permit from the government, which continues to implement the Press Ordinance enacted by the Mandatory Government in 1933. Permits can be refused for a variety of reasons, including that the proprietor is less than 25 years old or has a criminal record or insufficient education. An investigation by Haaretz early in 2016 revealed that in the preceding decade at least 62 out of more than 500 permit applications had been rejected. Other regulations, including the 1945 Defence (Emergency) Regulations, can also be used to regulate newspaper publication.

According to information provided by the military censor in response to a Freedom of Information request, in 2017 the censor banned the publication of 271 articles outright, and fully or partially redacted 21% of the articles submitted to it.

Following the 2017 Qatar diplomatic crisis Israel took steps to ban Qatar-based Al Jazeera by closing its Jerusalem office, revoking press cards, and asking cable and satellite broadcasters not to broadcast al-Jazeera. Defence minister, Avigdor Lieberman, had described some of al-Jazeera reports as "Nazi Germany-style" propaganda. It was not clear if the measures covered Al Jazeera English, considered less strident.

Under Israeli law, it is forbidden to proselytize to a person under 18 without the consent of a parent. It is also forbidden to offer material benefits in the process of proselytizing.

Freedom House 
Freedom House publishes an annual Freedom of the Press report. The 2013 report described Israel as having "the freest press in the region" but downgraded its status from "Free" to "Partly Free" in response to "the indictment of journalist Uri Blau for possession of state secrets, the first time this law had been used against the press in several decades, as well as instances of politicized interference with the content of the Israel Broadcasting Authority radio programs and concerns surrounding the license renewal of television's Channel 10."

Reporters Without Borders 
In 2020 Reporters Without Borders ranked Israel 88th in their Press Freedom Index The results for Israel and the Palestinian National Authority from 2002 to the present are shown below, with lower numbers indicating better treatment of reporters:

List of media outlets

Print 

Israel has a large number of dailies, weeklies and periodicals, all privately owned.
 B'Sheva: Hebrew-language weekly religious newspaper.
 Calcalist: Hebrew-language daily business newspaper.
 Globes: Hebrew-language daily business newspaper (with online English edition).
 Haaretz: Israel's oldest daily newspaper with Hebrew and English editions.
 Hamodia: daily Haredi newspaper with Hebrew, English and French editions.
 Israel Hayom: Hebrew-language free daily newspaper (with online English edition).
 Israel Post: Hebrew-language free daily newspaper.
 Al-Ittihad: Arabic-language daily communist newspaper.
 The Jerusalem Post: Israel's oldest English-language newspaper.
 Kul al-Arab: Arabic-language weekly newspaper.
 Maariv: Hebrew-language daily newspaper.
 Makor Rishon: Hebrew-language weekly newspaper.
 TheMarker: Hebrew-language business media.
 Vesti: Russian-language daily newspaper.
 Yated Ne'eman: daily Haredi newspaper with Hebrew and English editions.
 Yedioth Ahronoth: Hebrew-language daily newspaper.

Broadcast 

 Channel 9: Russian-language television channel.
 Keshet 12 Hebrew-language television channel.
 Reshet 13: Hebrew-language television channel.
 Channel 20: Hebrew-language television channel aimed at Jewish audience.
 Galei Tzahal: Hebrew-language general interest radio station.
 Galgalatz: Hebrew-language radio station broadcasting music, traffic reports and news.
 i24news: international news television channel in English, French and Arabic.
 Israeli Broadcasting Corporation: public broadcaster.
 Kan 11: Hebrew-language television channel.
 Kan 23 (Educational): Hebrew-language television channel for children.
 Kan 33 (Makan): Arabic-language television channel.
 Kol Yisrael: radio service.
 Knesset Channel: Hebrew-language political television channel.
 Kol Chai: Hebrew-language radio station aimed at Orthodox audience.

Internet 

 +972: A blog-based web magazine in English, with a Hebrew companion  providing on-the-ground reporting and analysis of events in Israel and Palestine.
 Arutz Sheva: radio station and website in Hebrew, English and Russian.
 Bamahane: online magazine in Hebrew published by the Israel Defense Forces (shut down).
 Debkafile: intelligence website in Hebrew and English.
 Kikar HaShabbat: Hebrew-language Haredi website.
 Mida: online magazine in Hebrew and English.
 mako: online news and entertainment portal.
 The Times of Israel: news website in English, Arabic, French, Persian and Hebrew.
 Bokra, Israeli-Arab media website
Davar, Histadrut-affiliated news website.
 TLV1: English-language internet radio station.
 Walla!: Hebrew-language web portal.
 Ynet: Hebrew-language and English-language news website.
 Zahav.ru: Russian-language news website.
 Lametayel: Hebrew-language travel website
 Israel-Nachrichten: German-language online daily

See also 

 Beit Sokolov
 Cinema of Israel
 Culture of Israel
 Editors Committee (Israel)
 Government Press Office (Israel)
 HaAyin HaShevi'it
 Historical Jewish Press
 Internet in Israel
 Jewish Telegraphic Agency
 Media coverage of the Arab–Israeli conflict
 Nakdi Report
 Politics of Israel
 Sokolov Award
 Telecommunications in Israel
 Television in Israel

References

External links 

 Media. Israel Ministry of Foreign Affairs
 The Media in Israel at the Jewish Virtual Library
 Israel profile in Freedom of the Press
 

 
Israel
Israel